Central Vietnam Helicopter Company (VNHC) (Vietnamese: Công ty Trực thăng miền Trung), also known as Central Service Flight Company (CSFC) or VNH Central, is a Vietnam People's Army-owned chartered helicopter airline in Vietnam that provides helicopter services for tourism as well as oil and gas exploration and VIP transportation. The company's headquarters are based in Danang International Airport, Nguyen Van Linh St., Thac Gian Ward, Thanh Khe District, Danang. It has a base in Nuoc Man Airport.

The company is one of three subsidiaries of Vietnam Helicopter Corporation, along with Northern Vietnam Helicopter Company and Southern Service Flight Company. They all have the same slogan: "Flying for your success" (Vietnamese: Cùng bay tới thành công).

Fleet
Mi-17-1V
EC–155 Eurocopter
EC-130 T2

References
 http://www.vnhc.com.vn/
 History about VNHC and VNHC services
 VNH Central and Uber introducing UberCHOPPER in Da Nang, Vietnam

External links
 Official website of VNHC

Airlines of Vietnam
Helicopter airlines
Da Nang